The Algerian Women's National Football Team represents Algeria in international women's football competitions. Founded during the rapid socio-economic change in North African nations, the Algerian women's football team played its first home game on July 5, 1962 at the Stadium of Algiers.  As of, 2021, the Algerian women's team FIFA World Women's Rankings stood at 79th in the world. The highest ranking was at 65th, in June, 2009.

The team has been coached by Radia Fertoul since August 2018. Algeria played its first match on May 14, 1998, against France and lost 14–0.

Algerian Women National Football Team haven't yet qualified to any World Cups, although they have qualified five times to the Women's African Cup of Nations in 2004, 2006, 2010, 2014 and 2018, all finishing in the group stage.

The Algeria women's national football team is the representative women's association football team of Algeria. Its governing body is the Algerian Football Federation (AFF) and it competes as a member of the Confederation of African Football (CAF).

Results

Legend

1998

2000

2003

2004

2006

2007

2008

2009

2010

2011

2014

2015

2016

2017

2018

2019

2020

2021

2022

See also
 Algeria national football team results
 List of Algeria women's international footballers

Notes

References

Results
2000s in Algeria
2010s in Algeria
2020s in Algeria
Women's national association football team results
Women's